Alastair Reid (21 July 1939 – 17 August 2011) was a Scottish television and film director, described by The Guardian on his death as "one of Britain's finest directors of television drama".

Reid studied at the Edinburgh College of Art and the Bristol Old Vic Theatre School. In 1964 he directed episodes of Emergency-Ward 10 for ATV and worked regularly in television for over thirty years. His work included writing the screenplay of the film Shout at the Devil (1976) and directing the first episode of Inspector Morse in 1987, as well as directing the television series Gangsters (1976—78), the serial Traffik (1989), the television series Selling Hitler (1991), based on the Hitler diaries, the miniseries Tales of the City (1993), and the 1997 TV adaptation of Joseph Conrad's Nostromo.

Filmography
Baby Love (1969)
The Night Digger (1971)
Something to Hide (1972)
Shades of Greene (1975)
Shout at the Devil (1976) (screenplay)
Gangsters (1976–77)
Hazell (1979)
Artemis 81 (1981)
Inspector Morse: The Dead of Jericho (1987)
Traffik (1989)
Selling Hitler (1991)
Tales of the City (1993)
Nostromo (1996)

References

External links

1939 births
2011 deaths
20th-century Scottish dramatists and playwrights
Alumni of Bristol Old Vic Theatre School
Alumni of the Edinburgh College of Art
Scottish film directors
Scottish screenwriters
Scottish television directors